Walter E. Freed (born August 13, 1951) is a Vermont politician and businessman who served two terms as Speaker of the Vermont House of Representatives.

Biography
Walter E. Freed was born in Providence, Rhode Island on August 13, 1951.  He graduated from Granville High School in 1970 and Dartmouth College in 1974, receiving a degree in Economics.

In 1979 Freed settled in Dorset and became President of Apollo Industries, a petroleum marketer which operates gasoline stations and convenience stores in several states.

Political career
A Republican, Freed served as Chairman of the Dorset School Board and as a member of the Bennington-Rutland Supervisory Union School Board.  In 1988 he was elected Chairman of the Vermont Republican Party, and he was a Delegate to the Republican National Conventions of 1992, 1996 and 2000.

In 1992 Freed was elected to the Vermont House of Representatives, and he served six terms, 1993 to 2005.  Freed was the Assistant Minority Leader from 1995 to 1997, and Minority Leader from 1997 to 2001.  In 2001 Republicans regained the majority in the House and Freed was elected Speaker, serving until 2005.

Later career
Freed did not run for reelection to the House in 2004.  In 2005 he was appointed to the Vermont Liquor Control Board, and was named the board's chairman in 2007. Freed also continued his involvement in Republican politics, including service as a delegate to state and national conventions.

References 

|-

1951 births
Living people
Dartmouth College alumni
School board members in Vermont
Speakers of the Vermont House of Representatives
Republican Party members of the Vermont House of Representatives
People from Dorset, Vermont
Politicians from Providence, Rhode Island